Simon Pierre (born 3 December 1979) is a Trinidad and Tobago sprinter. He competed in the men's 4 × 400 metres relay at the 2000 Summer Olympics.

References

External links
 

1979 births
Living people
Athletes (track and field) at the 1999 Pan American Games
Athletes (track and field) at the 2000 Summer Olympics
Trinidad and Tobago male sprinters
Olympic athletes of Trinidad and Tobago
Place of birth missing (living people)
Pan American Games competitors for Trinidad and Tobago